Elgonina is a genus of tephritid  or fruit flies in the family Tephritidae.

Species
Elgonina dimorphica Freidberg & Merz, 2006
Elgonina flavicornis Freidberg & Merz, 2006
Elgonina fuscana Munro, 1957
Elgonina inexpextata Freidberg & Merz, 2006
Elgonina infuscata Freidberg & Merz, 2006
Elgonina pollinosa Freidberg & Merz, 2006
Elgonina refulgens Munro, 1957
Elgonina splendida Freidberg & Merz, 2006
Elgonina yaromi Freidberg & Merz, 2006

References

Tephritinae
Tephritidae genera
Diptera of Africa